uMdoni Local Municipality is an administrative area in the Ugu District of KwaZulu-Natal in South Africa. Umdoni is an isiZulu name for the indigenous tree, Mdoni (Syzgium gerrardi).

Main places
The 2001 census divided the municipality into the following main places:

Politics 

The municipal council consists of thirty-seven members elected by mixed-member proportional representation. Nineteen councillors are elected by first-past-the-post voting in nineteen wards, while the remaining eighteen are chosen from party lists so that the total number of party representatives is proportional to the number of votes received. In the election of 1 November 2021 the African National Congress (ANC) won a majority of seventeen seats on the council.
The following table shows the results of the election.

By-elections from November 2021 
The following by-elections were held to fill vacant ward seats in the period since November 2021.

After the by-election, the council was reconfigured as below:

References

External links
 http://www.umdoni.gov.za/

KwaZulu-Natal South Coast
Local municipalities of the Ugu District Municipality